Solarized is the fourth solo album released by Ian Brown, the former lead singer of The Stone Roses. The album was first released in the United Kingdom on 13 September 2004.

Background
The album was the first album release on the revived Polydor imprint Fiction Records.

Canadian and Australian releases did not feature "Happy Ever After". The North American edition of Solarized contains an exclusive U.S. bonus track called "Lovebug".

The song "Happy Ever After" was used in an episode of Top Gear during the review of the 2007 Jaguar XK. It has also been used in the series Ramsay's Kitchen Nightmares and for the adverts of Law & Order: UK.

Unlike his previous, and subsequent albums, Solarized was not originally released on vinyl, but in April 2016, it was finally released on a limited run of 2000 vinyl copies as part of Record Store Day.

Track listing
 "Longsight M13" (Ian Brown & Aziz Ibrahim) – 3:12
 "Time Is My Everything" (Brown & Tim Hutton) – 3:52
 "Destiny or Circumstance" (Brown) – 2:35
 "Upside Down" (Brown) – 3:12
 "Solarized" (Brown & Ibrahim) - 3:47
 "The Sweet Fantastic" (Brown, Charlie Waddington & Dan Bierton) – 3:52
 "Keep What Ya Got" (feat. Noel Gallagher) (Brown & Noel Gallagher) – 4:28
 "Home Is Where the Heart Is" (Brown) – 3:06
 "One Way Ticket to Paradise" (Brown & Ibrahim) – 4:15
 "Kiss Ya Lips (No I.D.)" (Brown & Darren Moss) – 3:56
 "Happy Ever After"  (Brown, Ibrahim & Inder "Goldfinger" Matharu) – 2:46
 "Lovebug" [US and Japan bonus track] (Brown & Ibrahim) - 3:03

Charts

Weekly charts

Year-end charts

References

External links
 

2004 albums
Ian Brown albums
Polydor Records albums